Gowzan (also Romanized as Gowzān; also known as Gowzūn) is a village in Balesh Rural District, in the Central District of Darab County, Fars Province, Iran. At the 2006 census, its population was 40, in 8 families.

References 

Populated places in Darab County